Geographical distance or geodetic distance is the distance measured along the surface of the earth. The formulae in this article calculate distances between points which are defined by geographical coordinates in terms of latitude and longitude. This distance is an element in solving the second (inverse) geodetic problem.

Introduction
Calculating the distance between geographical coordinates is based on some level of abstraction; it does not provide an exact distance, which is unattainable if one attempted to account for every irregularity in the surface of the earth. Common abstractions for the surface between two geographic points are:

Flat surface;
Spherical surface;
Ellipsoidal surface.

All abstractions above ignore changes in elevation. Calculation of distances which account for changes in elevation relative to the idealized surface are not discussed in this article.

Nomenclature

Latitude and longitude coordinates on maps are usually expressed in degrees. In the given forms of the formulae below, one or more values must be expressed in the specified units to obtain the correct result. Where geographic coordinates are used as the argument of a trigonometric function, the values may be expressed in any angular units compatible with the method used to determine the value of the trigonometric function. Many electronic calculators allow calculations of trigonometric functions in either degrees or radians. The calculator mode must be compatible with the units used for geometric coordinates.

Differences in latitude and longitude are labeled and calculated as follows:

It is not important whether the result is positive or negative when used in the formulae below.

"Mean latitude" is labeled and calculated as follows:

Colatitude is labeled and calculated as follows:
For latitudes expressed in radians:

For latitudes expressed in degrees:

Unless specified otherwise, the radius of the earth for the calculations below is:
 = 6,371.009 kilometers = 3,958.761 statute miles = 3,440.069 nautical miles.

 = Distance between the two points, as measured along the surface of the earth and in the same units as the value used for radius unless specified otherwise.

Singularities and discontinuity of latitude/longitude

Longitude has singularities at the Poles (longitude is undefined) and a discontinuity at the ±180° meridian. Also, planar projections of the circles of constant latitude are highly curved near the Poles. Hence, the above equations for delta latitude/longitude and mean latitude may not give the expected answer for positions near the Poles or the ±180° meridian.

If a calculation based on latitude/longitude should be valid for all Earth positions, it should be verified that  the discontinuity and the Poles are handled correctly. Another solution is to use n-vector instead of latitude/longitude, since this representation does not have discontinuities or singularities.

Flat-surface formulae

A planar approximation for the surface of the earth may be useful over small distances. The accuracy of distance calculations using this approximation become increasingly inaccurate as:

 The separation between the points becomes greater;
 A point becomes closer to a geographic pole.

The shortest distance between two points in plane is a straight line. The Pythagorean theorem is used to calculate the distance between points in a plane.

Even over short distances, the accuracy of geographic distance calculations which assume a flat Earth depend on the method by which the latitude and longitude coordinates have been projected onto the plane. The projection of latitude and longitude coordinates onto a plane is the realm of cartography.

The formulae presented in this section provide varying degrees of accuracy.

Spherical Earth projected to a plane

This formula takes into account the variation in distance between meridians with latitude:

where:
 must be in units compatible with the method used for determining 

To convert latitude or longitude to radians use

This approximation is very fast and produces fairly accurate result for small distances . Also, when ordering locations by distance, such as in a database query, it is faster to order by squared distance, eliminating the need for computing the square root.

Ellipsoidal Earth projected to a plane

The FCC prescribes the following formulae for distances not exceeding :

where
 = Distance in kilometers;
 must be in units compatible with the method used for determining 

It may be interesting to note that:
 = kilometers per degree of latitude difference;
 = kilometers per degree of longitude difference;

For a more computationally efficient implementation of the formula above, multiple applications of cosine can be replaced with a single application and use of recurrence relation for Chebyshev polynomials.

Polar coordinate flat-Earth formula

where the colatitude values are in radians. For a latitude measured in degrees, the colatitude in radians may be calculated as follows:

Spherical-surface formulae

If one is willing to accept a possible error of 0.5%, one can use formulas of spherical trigonometry on the sphere that best approximates the surface of the earth.

The shortest distance along the surface of a sphere between two points on the surface is along the great-circle which contains the two points.

The great-circle distance article gives the formula for calculating the distance along a great-circle on a sphere about the size of the Earth. That article includes an example of the calculation.

Tunnel distance

A tunnel between points on Earth is defined by a line through three-dimensional space between the points of interest.
The great circle chord length may be calculated as follows for the corresponding unit sphere:

The tunnel distance between points on the surface of a spherical Earth is
.

Ellipsoidal-surface formulae

An ellipsoid approximates the surface of the earth much better than a
sphere or a flat surface does.  The shortest distance along the surface
of an ellipsoid between two points on the surface is along the
geodesic.  Geodesics follow more complicated paths than great
circles and in particular, they usually don't return to their starting
positions after one circuit of the earth.  This is illustrated in the
figure on the right where f is taken to be 1/50 to accentuate the
effect.  Finding the geodesic between two points on the earth, the
so-called inverse geodetic problem, was the focus of many
mathematicians and geodesists over the course of the 18th and 19th
centuries with major contributions by
Clairaut,
Legendre,
Bessel,
and Helmert.
Rapp
provides a good summary of this work.

Methods for computing the geodesic distance are widely available in
geographical information systems, software libraries, standalone
utilities, and online tools.  The most widely used algorithm is by
Vincenty,
who uses a series which is accurate to third order in the flattening of
the ellipsoid, i.e., about 0.5 mm; however, the algorithm fails to
converge for points that are nearly antipodal.  (For
details, see Vincenty's formulae.)  This defect is cured in the
algorithm given by
Karney,
who employs series which are accurate to sixth order in the flattening.
This results in an algorithm which is accurate to full double precision
and which converges for arbitrary pairs of points on the earth.  This
algorithm is implemented in GeographicLib.

The exact methods above are feasible when carrying out calculations on a
computer. They are intended to give millimeter accuracy on lines of any
length; one can use simpler formulas if one doesn't need millimeter
accuracy, or if one does need millimeter accuracy but the line is short.
Rapp, Chap. 6, describes the Puissant method,
the Gauss mid-latitude method, and the Bowring method.

Lambert's formula for long lines

Lambert's formulae
give accuracy on the order of 10 meters over thousands of kilometers. First convert the latitudes ,  of the two points to reduced latitudes ,  

where  is the flattening.

where  is the equatorial radius of the chosen spheroid.

On the GRS 80 spheroid Lambert's formula is off by

0 North 0 West to 40 North 120 West, 12.6 meters
0N 0W to 40N 60W, 6.6 meters
40N 0W to 40N 60W, 0.85 meter

Bowring's method for short lines

Bowring maps the points to a sphere of radius R′, with latitude and longitude represented as φ′ and λ′.  Define

where the second eccentricity squared is

The spherical radius is

(The Gaussian curvature of the ellipsoid at φ1 is 1/R′2.)
The spherical coordinates are given by

, .  The resulting problem on the sphere may be solved using the techniques for great-circle navigation to give approximations for the spheroidal distance and bearing.  Detailed formulas are given by Rapp, §6.5 and Bowring.

Altitude correction 
The variation in altitude from the topographical or ground level down to the sphere's or ellipsoid's surface, also changes the scale of distance measurements.
The slant distance s (chord length) between two points can be reduced to the arc length on the ellipsoid surface S as:

where R is evaluated from Earth's azimuthal radius of curvature and h are ellipsoidal heights are each point. 
The first term on the right-hand side of the equation accounts for the mean elevation and the second term for the inclination.
A further reduction of the above Earth normal section length to the ellipsoidal geodesic length is often negligible.

See also
Arc measurement
Earth radius
Spherical Earth
Great-circle distance
Great-circle navigation
Ground sample distance
Vincenty's formulae
Meridian arc
Scale (map)

References

External links
An online geodesic calculator (based on GeographicLib).
An online geodesic bibliography.

Cartography
Earth
Geodesy